Vieille Case, sometimes spelled as Vielle-Case, is a village on the north coast of Dominica. The Commonwealth of Dominica in the West Indies was first inhabited by the Kalinago tribe referred to by the Europeans as Caribs. Itassi (pronounced: e-tassy) is the Kalinago name for the area in Dominica which is now known as Vieille Case.

Vieille Case has an estimated population of 726. The name is a local French term for "old house".

When Europeans first settled in the area, they lived there together with the Caribs. The current villagers are mixed descendants of the Kalinagos, the French settlers and the African slaves that were imported to the area.

The centre of the village is called "Under The Mango". There are various shops, similar to convenience stores, located here. Few restaurants can be found in this tropical village. There is however, a shop that sells groceries and fried chicken called "Anna's". The mango tree to which the name refers is no longer in the centre of the village. There are two primary beaches, Au Parc and Au Tout.

Vieille Case was a filming location for Pirates of the Caribbean. The area was the birthplace of local politicians Edward Oliver LeBlanc, Roosevelt Skerrit and Dominica Parliamentary Representative Alexis Williams.

Recreation
There are two main beaches in Vieille Case:
Au Parc, used primarily for swimming
Au Tout, used primarily for fishing.

Genealogy 
The most common family names include Hamilton, Joseph, LeBlanc, Royer and Seaman.

Agriculture
High in the mountains above the village lies an expanse of land called "La Vie Douce" (The sweet life). This is the primary place for farming Dasheen, Ginger, Yams, Pepper and Bananas. Many citizens use farming to make a living. The village also has a miniature market on the outer edge of "Under The Mango", used to sell some of the provisions brought down by the farmers.

Churches
The Catholic Church that was located just up the street from the Credit Union of Vieille Case collapsed during 2005 because of a severe earthquake. The church was split down the middle.  A link to few pictures of the aftermath is at http://mydominica.org.

Education
There is one school located in Vieille Case which is the Primary School. Other schools that are near Roseau (close to Vieille Case):
Dublanc Secondary School
Dominica Seventh Day Adventist Secondary
Kairi School of Music
Destiny Pre School

Notable people 

 Jerelle Joseph

References

External links
 A to Z of Dominica Heritage: Vieille Case
 Photos from Vieille Case

Populated places in Dominica
Saint Andrew Parish, Dominica